Wolf Creek  is a stream in Phelps County in the Ozarks of Missouri. It is a tributary of Beaver Creek.

Wolf Creek was so named on account of wolves in the area.

See also
List of rivers of Missouri

References

Rivers of Phelps County, Missouri
Rivers of Missouri
Tributaries of the Gasconade River